Vardanashen (formerly, Chibukhchi) is a town in the Armavir Province of Armenia.

See also 
Armavir Province

References 
 
 
 

Populated places in Armavir Province